Ramya NSK is an Indian playback singer, who has predominantly sung for Tamil language and films. Apart from her work as a singer, she is recognised for being the granddaughter of comedian N. S. Krishnan and actress T. A. Mathuram.

Career
Ramya graduated in Visual Communication from Women's Christian College and later joined the radio station, Radio City. She was posted in Chennai where she worked for the firm as a music manager for five years. Along with Carnatic music, she trained in contemporary style music with the Emmanuel Methodist Church choir for a period of eight years. She also acted in the movie Tharai Thappattai.

Having sung over 400 songs for Indian films, Ramya is best known for the song "Satru Munbu" from Gautham Vasudev Menon's Neethaane En Ponvasantham, which had music composed by Ilaiyaraaja. For the song, she received the Best Female Playback Singer award for Tamil cinema during the Filmfare Awards ceremony in 2013. She later also won a similar prize at the Vijay Awards during the same year.

In 2018, Ramya appeared on the Tamil reality television show, Bigg Boss, hosted by Kamal Haasan. She stated that she was keen to experience the opportunity to understand what a "luxurious jail" may be like. She was evicted early in the process  After her eviction, Kamal Haasan suggested her "boring" character may have worked against her.

Personal life
In 2017, Ramya married Arjun, but they divorced later that year.

In September 2019, Ramya married serial actor Sathya, and she gave birth to a baby boy in July 2020.

Discography

Tamil

Telugu

Kannada

Malayalam

Television
Bigg Boss Tamil 2 – Evicted Day 35
Mr and Mrs Chinnathirai Season 2 – Top 7
BB Jodigal

References

Living people
Singers from Chennai
Indian women playback singers
Tamil singers
Tamil-language singers
Year of birth missing (living people)
Filmfare Awards South winners
21st-century Indian singers
Women musicians from Tamil Nadu
21st-century Indian women singers
Bigg Boss (Tamil TV series) contestants